The Parthini, Partini or Partheni were an Illyrian tribe that lived in the inlands of southern Illyria (modern Albania). They likely were located in the Shkumbin valley controlling the important route between the Adriatic Sea and Macedonia, which corresponded to the Via Egnatia of Roman times. Consequently, their neighbours to the west were the Taulantii and to the east the Dassaretii in the region of Lychnidus.

Etymology 

The Parthini often appears in ancient accounts describing the Illyrian Wars and Macedonian Wars. Their name was written in Ancient Greek as Παρθῖνοι, Parthînoi, Παρθηνοι, Parthenoi, Παρθεηνᾶται Partheēnâtai and in Latin as Parthini or Partheni. They are mentioned by Livy, Caesar, Strabo vii.; Appian, Illyr. 1; Dion Cass. xli. 49; Cic. in Pis. 40; Pomp. Mela, ii. 3. § 11; Plin. iii. 26.

According to a mythological tradition reported by Appian (2nd century AD), the Parthini were among the South-Illyrian tribes that took their names from the first generation of the descendants of Illyrius, the eponymous ancestor of all the Illyrian peoples.

Geography 

The Parthini most likely inhabited the area between the hinterland of Dyrrhachium at the Tirana plane in the north, and the hinterland of Apollonia at the Apsus river (Seman) in the south. Their territory likely included the Shkumbin valley, hence they controlled the important route between the Adriatic Sea and Macedonia, which corresponded to the Via Egnatia of Roman times. Initially, the Parthini may have held the lands around Epidamnus-Dyrrhachium, but later they were probably pushed more inland by the Taulantii losing their coastal holdings.

A walled city built in the 4th century BC at the latest has been found on the Gradishtë plateau near Belsh. It developed from an early 7th century BC hilltop settlement, and was located on the route leading from Apollonia along the Apsus river to the Shkumbin. Its ancient name is not known, but it can be assumed to have been the chief settlement of the Parthini. It existed until late antiquity, and was destroyed by the Slavic invasion.

Culture

Language 

The idiom spoken by the Parthini is included in the southern Illyrian onomastic province in modern linguistics. The territory they inhabited belongs to the area that is considered in current scholarship as the linguistic core of Illyrian.

Religion 

The Parthini worshiped a supreme god recognized through interpretatio romana as 'Jupiter Parthinus'. It is attested in Latin epigraphic material as  Partinus.

History 

The Parthini are often mentioned in the course of the Roman wars in Illyria and Macedonia, 229 BCE, but as friends rather than foes of the Romans, having submitted at an early period to their arms. (Polyb. ii. 11; Livy xxix. 12.) After the death of Philip, king of Macedon, they appear to have been added to the dominions of Pleuratus, an Illyrian prince allied to the Romans. (Polyb. xviii. 30; Liv. xxx. 34, xliv. 30.) Their principal town was Parthus (Steph. B. s. v.), which was taken by Caesar in the course of his campaign with Pompeius. (Caes. B.C. iii. 41.) The double-hilled Dimallum, the strongest among the Illyrian places, with two citadels on two heights, connected by a wall (Polyb. iii. 18, vii. 9), was within their territory. There is no indication, however, of its precise situation, which was probably between Lissus and Epidamnus. Livy mentions (xxix. 12) two other fortresses: Eugenium and Bargulum.

Economy 

Located in the inlands of southern Illyria, the Parthini controlled the important route between the Adriatic Sea and Macedonia, which corresponded to the Via Egnatia of Roman times.

Ancient historical sources testify agricultural economy among the Parthini, who were attested to have cultivated corn in Roman times. During the Great Roman Civil War the Parthini were obliged to deliver their corn supply for Pompey's troops. The situation changed with Caesar's arrival in Illyria. Once he had landed in Palaeste on the Ceraunian Mountains, the Illyrian communities, which were garrisoned by Pompey and the Senate, welcomed Caesar.

See also 
List of ancient Illyrian peoples and tribes

References

Bibliography 

Illyrian tribes
Illyrian Albania
Ancient tribes in Albania